Vernay's climbing mouse (Dendromus vernayi) is a species of rodent in the family Nesomyidae.
It is found only in Angola.
Its natural habitat is moist savanna.

References
 Dieterlen, F. 2004.  Dendromus vernayi.   2006 IUCN Red List of Threatened Species.   Downloaded on 19 July 2007.

Endemic fauna of Angola
Dendromus
Mammals of Angola
Mammals described in 1937
Taxonomy articles created by Polbot